Staffan Kihlbom (born 23 January 1964) is a Swedish actor, who appeared in the 2000 film The Beach.

External links

1964 births
Living people
Place of birth missing (living people)
Swedish male film actors
21st-century Swedish male actors
20th-century Swedish male actors